Anthony John Topham (27 October 1929 – 2 March 2004) was a British academic and writer. He was an active trade unionist and campaigner for workers rights.

Topham was born in Hull. He was educated at Beverley Grammar School, and earned a degree in politics and economics from University of Leeds.

He was married to Karen, and they had two sons, Ralph and Nigel.

References

1929 births
2004 deaths
People from Kingston upon Hull
Alumni of the University of Leeds
People educated at Beverley Grammar School